Jabba Khattak is a village located in Pabbi Tehsil of Nowshera District, Pakistan. It has a small dam which is being built for irrigation and to supply drinking water to the area surrounding the village.

Tribes and Clans
Jabba Khattak is inhabited by the Khattak tribe of the Pashtuns. The tribe is then divided into clans (khels), namely:

Zari Khel 
Parcham Khel
Molayan
Khudad Khel
Cirkay
Baba Khel

Each clan has its own mullah/leader which is their village clan's representative in a Pashtun council called the jirga, to settle village disputes and progress.

Mosques
There are Three Main Mosques in Jabba Khattak Village:
Central Mosque (Zari Khel)
Bara Jumat (Parcham Khel)
Khudad Khel Mosque

See also 
 Pabbi Tehsil
 Nowshera District

References 

Villages in Khyber Pakhtunkhwa
Populated places in Nowshera District